Kingsley Chukwukamadu Obuh (born 22 March 1976), at Ubulu-Uku,  is the Bishop of Asaba Diocese in the Anglican Communion. He was consecrated Bishop of Asaba in 2022.
He has been married to Comfort Obuh.

Background and early life
Kingsley Obuh is a native of Ubulu-Uku in Aniocha South local government area of Delta State where he was born on 22 March 1976.
He attended Uganda Christian University in 2009 where he bagged a degree in Divinity Theology, and also obtained a master's degree in Christian Theology from Ambrose Alli University in 2012.
Until his election as Bishop, He was the Administrative Secretary and Personal Assistant to the Primate of Church of Nigeria.

4th substantive Bishop of Asaba Diocese
On 25 February 2022, he was elected Bishop of Asaba Diocese alongside others at the Episcopal synod of the Church of Nigeria held at St Andrew's Anglican Church, Port Harcourt, Rivers State. On 5 April 2022, he was enthroned Bishop of Asaba Diocese by Henry Ndukuba and assumed office, taking over from Justus Mogekwu.

References

Living people
1946 births
Uganda Christian University alumni
Anglican bishops of Asaba
People from Delta State